Halfordia is a genus of plants in the family Rutaceae containing the single species Halfordia kendack commonly known as kerosenewood, southern ghittoe or saffronheart, is a rainforest plant that is native to eastern Australia, New Guinea and New Caledonia. It is a shrub or tree with elliptical to egg-shaped leaves with the narrower end towards the base, panicles of white, greenish white or yellowish flowers and purple to bluish black, spherical to oval fruit.

Description
It has grey or pale yellowish-brown bark with corky pustules and is often rough and wrinkled. The leaf tapers to the base and has a rounded or tapered tip and new leaves have a noticeable aromatic scent resembling eau de cologne. There are many conspicuous, closely spaced oil dots.

Taxonomy
The genus Halfordia was first formally described in 1865 by Ferdinand von Mueller in Fragmenta phytographiae Australiae and the first species he described was Halfordia drupifera, now considered a nomen illegitimum.

In 1860, Xavier Montrouzier described Eriostemon kendack in Mémoires de l'Académie Royale des Sciences, Belles-Lettres et Arts de Lyon, and in 1911, André Guillaumin changed the name to Halfordia kendack in Notulae Systematicae.

Halfordia is named after George Britton Halford and "kendack" is an indigenous name for this tree in New Caledonia.

Distribution and habitat
It is found in New Caledonia, New Guinea and eastern Australia. In Australia it occurs from the Torres Strait Islands to the Cape York Peninsula in Queensland, south to Iluka in New South Wales, including on the Mcpherson and Tweed Ranges.

Ecology
The hard seed is surrounded by pulp, which is eaten by a variety of birds, such as the green catbird, topknot pigeon and wompoo fruit dove. Germination from seeds can be difficult, often erratic.

Uses
Before the development of fibreglass and carbon fibre, the timber of this species was used in the manufacture of fishing rods. The oily, flexible timber is hard, weighing 1100 kg per cubic metre. This plant is gaining popularity in horticulture. The wood is highly flammable, and chips of wood may be used to start a fire, even when wet, hence one of the common names, "kerosene wood".

References

kendack
Zanthoxyloideae genera
Trees of Australia
Flora of New South Wales
Flora of Queensland
Flora of New Caledonia
Monotypic Rutaceae genera